Karlatornet is a skyscraper under construction by Serneke in Lindholmen in Gothenburg, Sweden. When finished, it will reach as high as 245 meters, with 73 floors from the ground. 

The building's architect firm is Skidmore, Owings and Merrill, and it is being built by Serneke Group AB. It is planned to be finished in 2023. 

When completed, it will reach 245 meters tall (804 ft), and will be the tallest building in the Nordic countries. On 22 September 2022, the tower reached this milestone at 193 meters, officially surpassing Turning Torso in Malmö.

Karlatornet is one out of 9 buildings that will be parts of the Karlastaden complex. 
Other buildings are:
Cassiopeja, 147 m (482 ft) 43 floors,
Auriga, 125 m (410 ft) 36 floors,
Virgo, 27 floors,
Capella, 17 floors,
Lynx, 17 floors,
Aries, 12 floors,
Callisto, 7 floors

External links
Website
Website of Karlastaden

References 

Building and structure articles needing translation from Swedish Wikipedia
Gothenburg
Skidmore, Owings & Merrill buildings